BMO Stadium, formerly Banc of California Stadium, is a soccer-specific stadium in the Exposition Park neighborhood of Los Angeles, California. It is the home of Major League Soccer's Los Angeles FC and the National Women's Soccer League's Angel City FC. Opened on April 18, 2018, it was the first open-air stadium built in the City of Los Angeles since Dodger Stadium in 1962. Constructed on the site of the former Los Angeles Memorial Sports Arena, it is located next to the Los Angeles Memorial Coliseum and just south of the main campus of the University of Southern California. Los Angeles FC subleases the site from the University which has a master lease with the LA Memorial Coliseum Commission for operating and managing the Coliseum and stadium properties.

LAFC signed a 15-year, $100 million naming rights deal with Banc of California in 2016 for the stadium. The deal was terminated in 2020, with the club announcing an eventual renaming in the coming years. The Bank of Montreal (BMO) was announced as the new stadium sponsor on January 19, 2023.

History

Planning and construction
The Los Angeles Times reported on May 17, 2015, that the team chose the Los Angeles Memorial Sports Arena site to build a 22,000-seat state-of-the-art stadium for the MLS in Exposition Park, costing $250 million. The group estimated the project would create 1,200 temporary construction jobs and 1,800 full-time jobs, generating $2.5 million in annual tax revenue. The environmental impact report, arena demolition, and stadium construction were expected to take three years and delay the team's debut to 2018.

On May 6, 2016, the Los Angeles City Council approved the stadium, clearing a way for the construction of the stadium.

A groundbreaking ceremony took place on August 23, 2016. At the event attended by owners and construction crews, LAFC announced a 15-year, $100 million naming rights deal for the stadium with the Banc of California. Demolition of the Los Angeles Memorial Sports Arena began shortly after the groundbreaking and was completed by October 2016.

Opening

The first public event at the stadium was an open practice and dedication ceremony held on April 18, 2018. The club's first match was played on April 29 against Seattle Sounders FC, with the home side winning 1–0. The lone goal was scored by Laurent Ciman in stoppage time in front of a capacity crowd of 22,000.

On May 26, 2020, Banc of California announced that they planned to end the naming rights deal, paying $20 million for early termination but remaining the club's banking sponsor. The Bank of Montreal was announced as the new naming rights sponsor on January 19, 2023, shortly after acquiring the California-based Bank of the West.

In November 2020, it was announced that the newly formed Angel City FC of the National Women's Soccer League would play at the stadium.

Features

Design
The seating capacity of the stadium is 22,000. The stadium's seating is at 34 degrees, which makes it among the steepest in MLS. It includes  of walkways and plazas open to the public. The stadium also features press box suites with a water fountain.

The ground's North End is home to the "3252" supporters group, so named for the number of seats in the safe standing section. It was built at an incline of 34 degrees and features angled handrails that are designed to resemble those used on rollercoasters. The central section of the stand has a removable stage for use during concerts and other events outside of sports. On top of the North End is a supporter-designed bar which can only be accessed from 3252 section.

A northeast slice of the stadium was designed to be open to capture the downtown Los Angeles skyline and the San Gabriel Mountains. Members of the media in the angled press box have one of the best vantage points to peer through the "keyhole".

Five percent of the stadium's parking spaces have electric vehicle charging stations and 20% electric vehicle ready infrastructure. The stadium has 440 planned parking spaces for bicycles and a bike path to the stadium as part of the My Figueroa Project. The stadium is a LEED Silver certified building.

2028 Summer Olympics
The stadium will be a part of the Downtown Sports Park and host some track and field events and both men's and women's soccer when Los Angeles hosts the 2028 Summer Olympics.

Major events

Soccer
The stadium was a venue for the 2019 CONCACAF Gold Cup. It hosted two matches in Group C. It also hosted the 2021 MLS All-Star Game on August 25, 2021.

The stadium served as the "home" venue for New York City FC during the 2022 CONCACAF Champions League Round of 16 due to issues with the club's other venues in the New York metropolitan area. Their primary and secondary stadiums (Yankee Stadium and Citi Field, respectively) were not approved by CONCACAF for use in the tournament, while the soccer-specific Red Bull Arena was undergoing renovations. Banc of California Stadium was chosen due to New York City FC's upcoming MLS regular season match to be played against the LA Galaxy at the nearby Dignity Health Sports Park.

Other sports

Rugby
It was announced on April 4, 2017, that the stadium would be host to rugby sevens tournaments. It will be the permanent home of the Grand Prix Rugby Series, the world's richest rugby sevens championship in history.

Lacrosse
It was announced on April 1, 2019, that the stadium would host the inaugural Premier Lacrosse League All-Star Game on July 21, 2019.

Boxing
On August 17, 2019, Banc of California Stadium held its first boxing event, a World Boxing Organization junior featherweight title fight with Emanuel Navarrete successfully defending his title against Francisco De Vaca by 3rd round technical knockout. The stadium held Austin McBroom vs. AnEsonGib on September 10, 2022, a professional crossover boxing event.

Other events

Concerts

BMO Stadium is also designed to host concerts and other musical events. 

The stadium hosted KIIS-FM's Wango Tango concert on June 2, 2018.  Beck appeared in October 2018. 

Mumford & Sons brought their Delta Tour to the stadium on August 3, 2019. British heavy metal band Iron Maiden's Legacy of the Beast World Tour was announced for September 14, 2019 at the stadium as well. 

The Rolling Loud hip-hop music festival was held at the stadium in 2018 and 2019. 2018 performers included Post Malone, Lil Wayne, Cardi B, and Lil Uzi Vert. 2019 performers included Chance the Rapper, Young Thug, Lil Baby, Future, A$AP Rocky, Meek Mill, YG, and Playboi Carti. 

Hard rock band Guns N' Roses played a sold-out show on August 19, 2021, as part of their 2020 Tour. 

Heavy metal band Rammstein played a show on September 23 and 24 2022, as part of the their  Rammstein Stadium Tour.

K-pop girl group TWICE held their encore concert for their 4th World Tour 'III' on May 14–15, 2022. Fellow K-pop act BLACKPINK concluded the North American leg of their Born Pink World Tour on November 19-20, 2022.

Mexican group RBD is set to perform four concerts in the stadium as part of their reunion tour in October 2023, the first time the group has performed live in 15 years.

Hard Summer is set to host part of their 2023 festival at the stadium on August 5 and 6, which will also include the nearby Los Angeles Memorial Coliseum and Exposition Park.

Cultural events
LAFC has stated that Banc of California will be used for local cultural events in Los Angeles's 9th District.

Esports 
In June 2018, Epic Games held a celebrity pro-am event for its multiplayer online video game Fortnite Battle Royale at Banc of California Stadium, as part of events coinciding with the 2018 Electronic Entertainment Expo (E3). The event was won by a team of professional player Ninja and electronic music producer Marshmello.

See also

List of soccer stadiums in the United States

References

External links

BMO Stadium - LAFC - Los Angeles Football Club

Los Angeles FC
Major League Soccer stadiums
Premier Lacrosse League venues
Soccer venues in Los Angeles
Lacrosse venues in California
Sports venues completed in 2018
Exposition Park (Los Angeles)
Exposition Park (Los Angeles neighborhood)
Gensler buildings
South Los Angeles
21st century in Los Angeles
CONCACAF Gold Cup stadiums
Rugby union stadiums in Los Angeles
Venues of the 2028 Summer Olympics
Olympic football venues
Olympic athletics venues
Music venues in Los Angeles
Stadium